KXEZ (92.1 FM) is a radio station broadcasting a Classic Country format supplied by satellite service Dial Global. The station is licensed to Farmersville, Texas and primarily serves suburbs north and east of Dallas.  KXEZ's signal is weak to nonexistent in most of Dallas. Studios are located on Greenville Avenue in north Dallas, and the transmitter is located southeast of Blue Ridge in Collin County.

KXEZ is owned by Ken Jones of Garland, Texas.  His company is known as Metro Broadcasters-Texas, Inc.

History
KXEZ began broadcasting in September 1998 with a format of standards and big-band selections with live personalities from 6 a.m. to 6 p.m. and "The Music of Your Life" format via satellite the rest of the broadcast day.  The station was promoted as EZ (Easy) 92.1.

Personalities during that era included Hal Mayfield, Jack Bishop and Ray Harland.

In September 2005, KXEZ began airing an oldies format promoted as "Good Times Oldies" supplied by the Jones Radio Networks (now Dial Global) by satellite.  Local traffic and weather reports were aired during mornings and afternoons.

Live, specialized oldies shows aired on Sunday nights during that period. KXEZ also broadcasts local high school sports including football, basketball, baseball and softball.

In December 2006, KXEZ switched to a Classic Country format provided by Dial Global.  KXEZ is now known as "The Possum" with recorded promos by country music legend George Jones. After Jones' passing in 2013, they changed the promos to honor the late, great country legend.

In 2011, KXEZ's owner, Ken Jones, decided to end live traffic and weather reports, and the station became totally automated except for high school sports.

External links

XEZ